Cheddleton is a civil parish in the district of Staffordshire Moorlands, Staffordshire, England. It contains 84 listed buildings that are recorded in the National Heritage List for England.  Of these, ten are at Grade II*, the middle of the three grades, and the others are at Grade II, the lowest grade.  The parish contains the village of Cheddleton, smaller settlements, including the village of Wetley Rocks, and the surrounding area.  The Caldon Canal joins its Leek Branch in the parish, and the listed buildings associated with these are bridges, locks, an aqueduct, and mileposts.  Also in the parish is the Cheddleton Flint Mill, and its listed buildings consist of watermills, furnaces, sheds, and mill cottages.  Most of the other listed buildings are houses, including two country houses, and associated structures, cottages, farmhouses and farm buildings.  The remainder of the listed buildings include churches and items in churchyards, road bridges, a railway station, a school and library, a former hospital and associated buildings, and a series of road mileposts.


Key

Buildings

References

Citations

Sources

z

Lists of listed buildings in Staffordshire